William Inglis (4 September 1899 – 12 January 1977) was an English professional footballer who played as a half back in the Football League, most notably for Reading and Brentford. He later managed Kent League club Cray Wanderers.

Honours 
Reading
 Football League Third Division South: 1925–26

Career statistics

References

1899 births
1977 deaths
People from Cramlington
Footballers from Northumberland
English footballers
Association football central defenders
Association football fullbacks
Newcastle United F.C. players
Derby County F.C. players
Hebburn Colliery F.C. players
Brentford F.C. players
Reading F.C. players
Exeter City F.C. players
Stockport County F.C. players
Watford F.C. players
Dartford F.C. players
Cray Wanderers F.C. players
English Football League players
English football managers
Cray Wanderers F.C. managers